Korn is a surname. Notable people with the surname include:

 Alejandro Korn, Argentine physician, psychiatrist, philosopher, reformist and politician 
 Arthur Korn (1870–1945), devised practical phototelegraphy in 1902, father-in-law of Theresa
 Arthur Korn (architect) (1891–1978), architect and urban planner
 David Korn (computer scientist), programmer, created the KornShell
 Dieter Korn (1958), German paleontologist specializing in ammonites
 Granino Arthur Korn (1922–2013), a German-born physicist, son of Arthur Korn
 Jim Korn, retired professional ice hockey player
 Jiří Korn, Czech musician and actor
 M. F. Korn, American science fiction author
 Marian Korn (1914–1987), Czechoslovakian-born printmaker  
 Theresa Marie Korn (1926–2020), American engineer, daughter-in-law of Arthur Korn
 Walter Korn (1908–1997), Prague-born author of chess opening books
 See also
 Kornhill
 Kornhill, Halmstad, Sweden

German-language surnames
Jewish surnames